Víllodas (in Basque Biloda and officially Víllodas/Biloda) is a village in Álava, Basque Country, Spain. It had 304 inhabitants in 2015 and it is located between the villages of Nanclares de la Oca and Trespuentes.

Until 1976, when it became part of Iruña de Oca, it was next to the village of Trespuentes within the separate municipality of Iruña.

Populated places in Álava